The Pannariaceae are a family of lichens in the order Peltigerales (suborder Collematineae). Species from this family have a widespread distribution, but are especially prevalent in southern temperate regions.

Genera
According to a recent (2020) estimate, the family contains 27 genera and about 360 species. The following list indicates the genus name, the taxonomic authority, year of publication, and the number of species:
Atrophysma  – 1 sp.
Austrella  – 3 spp.
Austroparmeliella  – 5 spp.
Degelia  – 16 spp.
Erioderma  – 32 spp.
Fuscoderma  – 5 spp.
Fuscopannaria  – 58 spp.
Kroswia  – 4 spp.
Gibbosporina  – 13 spp.
Homothecium  – 4 spp.
Joergensenia  – 1 sp.
Leciophysma  – 2 spp.
Leightoniella  – 1 sp.
Leioderma  – 7 spp.
Lepidocollema  – 22 spp.
Leptogidium  – 3 spp.

Nebularia  – 2 spp.
Nevesia  – 1 sp.
Pannaria  – ca. 40 spp.
Parmeliella  – ca. 40 spp.
Pectenia  – 4 spp.
Physma  – 12 spp.
Protopannaria  – 7 spp.
Psoroma  – ca. 70 spp.
Psoromaria  – 2 spp.
Psoromidium  – 2 spp.
Psorophorus  – 2 spp.
Ramalodium  – 6 spp.

Rockefellera  – 1 sp.
Siphulastrum  – 4 spp.
Staurolemma  – 3 spp.
Steineropsis  – 1 sp.
Xanthopsoroma  – 2 spp.

References

Peltigerales
Lichen families
Lecanoromycetes families
Taxa described in 1872
Taxa named by Edward Tuckerman